Giuseppe Messina (born 12 February 1993) is an Italian footballer who plays for Enna Calcio.

Biography
Messina was a youth product of Calcio Catania. Messina was a player of their under-15 team in 2007–08 season. After a loan to Milazzo, Messina returned to Catania. He served as the backup keeper of the first team, as well as the first choice of the reserve team, as one of the four overage player.

On 28 July 2013 Messina was signed by Lega Pro Prima Divisione club Pro Patria, in a co-ownership deal. At the same time the club sold keeper Andrea Sala to Ternana in a temporary deal. Messina played 11 games in 2013–14 Lega Pro Prima Divisione season, while Ivano Feola played 19 times. In June 2014 the co-ownership was renewed.

However, on 22 July 2014 Messina was signed by Reggiana in a three-year contract, one day after the signing of Feola. The club also sold Sala to Ternana on 25 July, which Reggiana signed Sala on 1 July. Once again, Messina was an understudy of Feola.

In 2015–16 season Messina was released.

On 1 August 2018, he joined Serie C club Siracusa. In October 2019, Messina joined Enna Calcio.

References

External links
 
 AIC profile (data by football.it) 

1993 births
Sportspeople from the Province of Enna
Footballers from Sicily
Living people
Italian footballers
Catania S.S.D. players
S.S. Milazzo players
Aurora Pro Patria 1919 players
A.C. Reggiana 1919 players
Serie C players
Serie D players
Association football goalkeepers
Siracusa Calcio players
People from Enna